Wang Sheng-wei (born 1 April 1984 in Taiwan), nicknamed "Magneto" and known as Haro Ngayaw in Amis language, is a Taiwanese baseball shortstop for the Fubon Guardians of the Chinese Professional Baseball League (CPBL). He holds the record for most Gold Gloves by any CPBL player with nine.

Career
In 2005, he played for the Anchorage Bucs of the Alaska Baseball League.  

In 2008, he was signed by the CTBC Brothers. That year he lead the league in stolen bases with 24 and earned the Stolen Bases Award. In the same season, he was hit by 19 pitches, which was the single season record at the time. 

In 2009, he improved his performance by raising his batting average to .305, and he recorded 42 stolen bases to lead the league in the stat for the second year in a row. 

In 2017, he reached 100 hit by pitches, tying the record that was then held by Chen Je-chang. He would hold this record for a short time, eventually being overtaken by Lin Hung-yu. 

He played with the Brothers through 2021, though after a 2021 season that saw him get minimal playtime he signed with the Fubon Guardians in early 2022. 

Wang represented Chinese Taipei national baseball team at the 2004 Haarlem Baseball Week, 2005 Asian Baseball Championship, 2005 Baseball World Cup, 2006 Haarlem Baseball Week, 2006 World University Baseball Championship, 2008 Olympics qualifying tournament, 2009 World Baseball Classic, 2012 Asian Baseball Championship, 2017 World Baseball Classic. 2018 MLB Japan All-Star Series, and the 2019 WBSC Premier12.

Career statistics

References

External links
 CPBL
 Player information from WikiBaseball (in Chinese)
Career statistics and player information from Baseball Reference

1984 births
Living people
Baseball second basemen
Baseball shortstops
Baseball third basemen
Brother Elephants players
People from Taitung County
2009 World Baseball Classic players
2017 World Baseball Classic players